Nikolai Sergeyevich Plotnikov (5 November 1897 – 3 February 1979) was a Soviet film actor. He appeared in the 1949 biopic Ivan Pavlov.

Selected filmography
 Dawn of Paris (1936) as General Dombrovsky
The Lonely White Sail (1937) as The Plainclothes Agent of the Tsar
 The Oppenheim Family (1939) as Edgar Oppenheim
 Lenin in 1918 (1939) as the kulak from Tamborsk
Gorky 2: My Apprenticeship (1939) as Nikiforytch
Gorky 3: My Universities (1940) as Nikiforytch
 The Wedding (1944) as the best man
 The Vow (1946) as Ivan Yermilov
The White Fang (1946) as Handsome Smith
 Ivan Pavlov (1949) as Nikodin Vasilyevich
The Battle of Stalingrad (1949) as Commissioner Gurov
 The Fall of Berlin (1950) as Walther von Brauchitsch
Least We Forget (1954) as Vsevolod Yevgenevich Yarchuk
 Nine Days in One Year (1962) as Professor Sintsov
Your Contemporary (1967) as Professor Nitochkyn
The Seagull (1972) as Piotr Nikolaïévitch Sorin

Awards
Honored Artist of the RSFSR (1933)
Stalin Prize of the first degree (1947)
People's Artist of the RSFSR (1957)
People's Artist of the USSR (1966)
All-Union Film Festival (1968) — Best Actor (Your Contemporary) 
 Karlovy Vary International Film Festival (1968) — Best Actor (Your Contemporary) 
Stanislavsky State Prize of the RSFSR (1970)
two Orders of Lenin (1972, 1977)
Order of the Red Banner of Labor (1967)
In Vyazma there is a street named after him.

References

Bibliography 
 Beumers, Birgit. Directory of World Cinema: Russia. Intellect Books, 2011.

External links 
 

1897 births
1979 deaths
People from Vyazma
People from Vyazemsky Uyezd
Communist Party of the Soviet Union members
Soviet male film actors
Soviet male stage actors
Soviet theatre directors
Academic staff of the Gerasimov Institute of Cinematography
Russian military personnel of World War I
Recipients of the Order of Lenin
People's Artists of the USSR
Stalin Prize winners
Burials at Novodevichy Cemetery